Petit Port racecourse is located in Nantes, Loire-Atlantique, France, in the Nantes Nord district. Inaugurated in 1875, this 35-hectare racecourse is open to gallop thanks to a 2,065-meter track made of grass and to trot thanks to a 1,411-meter pozzolan track with a rope at the left. Grandstands were built in 1972 and can accommodate 5,000 people. They are equipped with a panoramic restaurant with a capacity of 350 persons.

History 
On 11 May 1875, the city of Nantes purchased 35 hectares of ground in order to build a race track and, according to an agreement with the army, a shooting range and parade ground. The first one was located on the island of Prairie-au-Duc (after being located on la prairie de Mauves close to Nantes railway station) and was too close to the "ponts de la Vendée" which were in construction. The detonation sounds made by the extractions of the rocks on Saint-Sébastien-Sur-Loire's buttress, necessary to the construction of the bridge, frightened the officers' horses.

References

Horse racing venues in France
Sports venues in Nantes
1875 establishments in France
Sports venues completed in 1875